During the 2012–13 season, the Manchester Phoenix participated in the semi-professional English Premier Ice Hockey League.

Schedule and results

Preseason

Regular season

Play-offs

See also 
 Manchester Phoenix
 English Premier Ice Hockey League

External links 
 Manchester Phoenix Official Website

Manchester Phoenix seasons
Man